Zabiele may refer to the following places in Poland:
Zabiele, Lower Silesian Voivodeship (south-west Poland)
Zabiele, Gmina Kolno in Podlaskie Voivodeship (north-east Poland)
Zabiele, Gmina Stawiski in Podlaskie Voivodeship (north-east Poland)
Zabiele, Mońki County in Podlaskie Voivodeship (north-east Poland)
Zabiele, Lubartów County in Lublin Voivodeship (east Poland)
Zabiele, Wysokie Mazowieckie County in Podlaskie Voivodeship (north-east Poland)
Zabiele, Łuków County in Lublin Voivodeship (east Poland)
Zabiele, Radzyń Podlaski County in Lublin Voivodeship (east Poland)
Zabiele, Mława County in Masovian Voivodeship (east-central Poland)
Zabiele, Ostrołęka County in Masovian Voivodeship (east-central Poland)
Zabiele, Warmian-Masurian Voivodeship (north Poland)